Dracaena arborea, the tree dracaena, is a species of flowering plant in the family Asparagaceae, native to western and west-central wet tropical Africa. It is used as a street tree in a number of African and Brazilian cities.

References

arborea
Flora of West Tropical Africa
Flora of West-Central Tropical Africa
Plants described in 1821